Geca can refer to:

Gilroy Early College Academy, abbreviated as GECA.
Geča, a municipality in Slovakia.